"Mope" is a song by American comedy rock band Bloodhound Gang, released in September 2000 as the fourth single from their third studio album Hooray for Boobies. The song contains numerous samples such as "Rock Me Amadeus" by Falco, "Relax" by Frankie Goes to Hollywood, "For Whom the Bell Tolls" by Metallica, the Pac-Man theme song, and Homer Simpson shouting "holy macaroni" from the "Treehouse of Horror VI" episode of The Simpsons. A music video for the single was released in June 2000.

Single track listing
 "Mope" (The Bloodhound Gang Mix)
 "Mope" (The Pet Shop Boys 7" Remix)
 "Mope" (The Swamp Remix)
 "Fire Water Burn" (The Bloodhound Gang Remix)

The single also includes the "Cousin Mike" version of the music video for "The Ballad of Chasey Lain", and has track 6 listed as "Tic Tac Toe – Remus Pops Jefferson Game" which is a tic-tac-toe board design on the CD itself, with the center hole representing the first move. In the liner notes, the listener is encouraged to post the CD to Remus Pops Jefferson if they have no-one to play with, and a postal address is included.

Charts

References

Bloodhound Gang songs
2000 singles
Songs written by Jimmy Pop
Songs written by Holly Johnson
Songs written by James Hetfield
Songs written by Lars Ulrich
Songs written by Cliff Burton
Songs written by Falco (musician)
1999 songs
Comedy rap songs